Patricia Louisianna Knop (October 23, 1940 – August 7, 2019) was an American screenwriter, television producer, art collector, and sculptor.

Early life and education 
Knop was born in Muskegon, Michigan, the daughter of Albert Ernest Knop and Alice Lillian Keat Knop. Her father worked in a refrigerator factory. She graduated from Muskegon High School in 1958.

Career 
Knop met her husband in the Bahamas in the 1960s. They opened several coffee shops in New York, New Jersey, and Iowa, before getting into show business. She was credited as a writer on the films The Passover Plot (1976), Lady Oscar (1979), Silence of the North (1981), 9½ Weeks (1986), Siesta (1987), Wild Orchid (1989), and Delta of Venus (1995). She was also a producer on the television series Red Shoe Diaries (1992 to 1996). In theatre, Knop co-wrote the book for the musical Whistle Down the Wind (1989) with Andrew Lloyd Webber and Gale Edwards.

Sculptures created by Knop appeared in the film Some Call it Loving (1973). Knop was an adventurous art collector; she and Zalman King filled their Santa Monica home with contemporary paintings and sculptures, antiques, salvaged items, and stained glass.

Personal life 
Knop married film director Zalman King in 1965; they had two daughters, Gillian and Chloe. Her husband died in 2012, and she died in 2019, at the age of 78, in Santa Monica.

References

External links

Lisa Borgnes Giramonti (November 12, 2009), "Fearless Women: Patricia Knop" A Bloomsbury Life; a blogpost about Knop, with many photographs of her art and home

1940 births
2019 deaths
People from Muskegon, Michigan
Screenwriters from Michigan
American women screenwriters
20th-century American screenwriters
20th-century American women writers